Zameer Mohammed Choudrey, Baron Choudrey  (born 23 March 1958) is a British billionaire businessman who is the chief executive of Bestway, the UK's eleventh-largest privately owned business. Bestway, founded by Choudrey's uncle, Sir Anwar Pervez, is the ninth-largest family-owned business with a turnover in excess of £3.4 billion. 

According to the Sunday Times Rich List UK, in 2020 his net worth is £1.53 billion (US$1.85 billion); which makes him the second-richest Pakistani in the UK.

He was appointed Commander of the Order of the British Empire (CBE) in the 2016 New Year Honours for services to the wholesale industry and charity.

On 23 March 2018, the President of Pakistan awarded him Sitara-i-Imtiaz (Star of Excellence) SI Pk, in recognition of his contributions to advancing Pakistan through his services and the wide array of philanthropic work.

On 10 September 2019, he was nominated for a life peerage in ex-prime minister Theresa May’s resignation honours list. He was created Baron Choudrey, of Hampstead in the London Borough of Barnet, on 9 October 2019. He formally joined the House of Lords on 5 November 2019.

Early life
Choudrey was born in March 1958. His parents hail from a remote village of Thathi in Gujar Khan, Pakistan. He moved to UK at the age of 12  with his family. He graduated from the University of Kent at Canterbury in 1981.

Career
In 1984, Choudrey qualified as an accountant with Simmons, Cohen, Fine and Partners (now Simmons Gainsford LLP). He is a Fellow of the Institute of Chartered Accountants in England and Wales and is also a member of the Institute of Directors in London. In November 2014 he received an honorary doctorate from the University of Kent.

He joined Bestway Group in 1984 as Financial Controller; he played a key role in the expansion of the Group's wholesale business through the acquisition of Bashin Cash & Carry in 1984, Crown Crest Limited in 1987 and Link Cash & Carry in 1988.

In 1990, Choudrey was appointed the finance director of Bestway Group. During the mid 1990s he was assigned the task of business diversification by the board of directors and in 1995 he was appointed chief executive of Bestway Cement.

In October 2002 having led the acquisition of United Bank Limited (UBL); he was appointed to the board of UBL. Since then he has been a director of UBL Insurers.

In July 2014 under his leadership Bestway Group acquired the Co-op's pharmacy business for £620 million or US$1.06 billion. Co-op pharmacy is the UK's third largest independent pharmacy business and the largest in Wales.

At the time of acquisition, pharmacy business was expected to increase the group's annual turnover to over £3 billion and the group's global workforce would increase to 33,600 people, with over 11,900 people employed in the UK.

In October 2015, he was declared the winner of the Grocer Cup for outstanding business achievement.

Philanthropy
In 1987, Choudrey was a founding Trustee of Bestway Foundation – a charitable trust of the Bestway Group that works exclusively in the health and education sectors.

In 1997 Bestway Foundation Pakistan was established and he was appointed Chairman of Bestway Foundation Pakistan.

Between 2008 and 2010 he served as Chairman of NGBF Trading Limited – the trading arm of GroceryAid.

In April 2009 he joined the Board of Trustees of Crimestoppers UK.

Between March 2010 and April 2019, he served as a trustee of GroceryAid  - the trade industry's flagship charity.

In May 2010, he was appointed as Deputy chairman of the Pakistan Britain Trade & Investment Forum.

He became a member of HRH Prince of Wales Pakistan Recovery Fund International Leadership Team in 2011.

In April 2013 he was invited by the British Asian Trust to join their UK Advisory Council.

In January 2018 he was appointed UK Chair of the British Asian Trust's Advisory Council.

In June 2019, Choudrey joined the Commonwealth Enterprise & Investment Council's Advisory Council.

Politics
Choudrey is a long-standing supporter and donor to the UK Conservative Party,  and in August 2013 was appointed the co-chairman of the Conservative Friends of Pakistan.

He made his maiden speech in the House of Lords on the 29th of January 2020; when he participated in the House of Lords debate on the Sutton Trust's Mobility Manifesto, published in November 2019, and the recommendations of the Social Mobility Commission's 2019 State of the Nation report.

In June 2020, during the House of Lords debate - the economic lessons learned from the COVID-19 pandemic and the measures necessary to repair the UK economy - he asked if the Government intended to expand the life insurance scheme to the SME sector, and specifically to BAME individuals employed in the SME sector who have been defined as key workers but are not covered by the current scheme.

In May 2021 - whilst participating in the debate on Her Majesty the Queen's Speech, he highlighted the issues being faced by community pharmacists.

See also
List of British Pakistanis

References

1958 births
Living people
Conservative Party (UK) life peers
British Muslims
Pakistani emigrants to the United Kingdom
Naturalised citizens of the United Kingdom
Pakistani chief executives
Pakistani industrialists
Wholesalers of the United Kingdom
Commanders of the Order of the British Empire
Recipients of Sitara-i-Imtiaz
Life peers created by Elizabeth II
British businesspeople of Pakistani descent
British billionaires
Pakistani billionaires
British politicians of Pakistani descent
Conservative Party (UK) donors
Alumni of the University of Kent